Hippopotamus gorgops is an extinct species of Hippopotamus. It first appeared in Africa during the late Pliocene. It became extinct during the Middle Pleistocene.

Taxonomy
The species was described by German scientist Wilhelm Otto Dietrich in 1928. It is closely related and possibly ancestral to the European species Hippopotamus antiquus. Remains assigned to H. gorgops and H. behemoth are known from the Ubeidiya locality in Israel, dating to approximately 1.6 million years ago, with some authors suggesting that H. behemoth is actually a synonym of H. gorops, given their similar morphology.

Description 
Another feature setting it apart from H. amphibius was the placement of its eyes. Modern hippos have eyes placed high on the skull, but H. gorgops had eyestalk-like orbits extruding above its skull, making it even easier for the creature to see its surroundings while (almost) fully under water.

References

 Petronio, C. (1995): Note on the taxonomy of Pleistocene hippopotamuses. Ibex 3: 53–55. PDF fulltext

Extinct hippopotamuses
Pliocene even-toed ungulates
Pleistocene even-toed ungulates
Pliocene mammals of Africa
Pleistocene mammals of Africa
Pliocene species first appearances
Pleistocene species extinctions
Fossil taxa described in 1928